Spumone (from spuma or "foam"), plural spumoni, is a molded gelato (a lower-fat Italian form of ice cream) made with layers of different colors and flavors, usually containing candied fruits and nuts.

Typically, it is of three flavors, with a fruit/nut layer between them. The ice cream layers are often mixed with whipped cream. Cherry, pistachio, and either chocolate or vanilla are the typical flavors of the ice cream layers in the United States, and the fruit/nut layer often contains cherry bits—causing the traditional red/pink, green, and brown color combination. 

Spumone is popular in places with large Italian immigrant populations such as the United States, Argentina and Brazil. August 21 is National Spumoni Day in the United States. November 13 is National Spumoni Day in Canada.

Neapolitan ice cream, named after Naples, is a variation of spumone.  Cherry was changed to strawberry and pistachio to chocolate to reflect the most popular American flavor preferences.

See also
 Neapolitan ice cream
 Spoom, a related dessert
 Tartufo

References

Flavors of ice cream
Italian desserts